"Weave Me the Sunshine" is a song written by Peter Yarrow, and was first released by Peter Yarrow in 1972. It was later covered by American singer Perry Como, whose 1974 Victor Records release  peaked at No. 5 on the Billboard Adult Contemporary chart. The song was also covered by Peter, Paul and Mary and released on their 1986 album No Easy Walk to Freedom.

References

1974 singles
Victor Records singles
1972 songs
Songs written by Peter Yarrow
Peter, Paul and Mary songs
Perry Como songs